John Reaves "Mule" Watson (October 15, 1896 in Arizona, Louisiana – August 25, 1949 in Shreveport, Louisiana), was a professional baseball player who was a pitcher in the Major Leagues from 1918 to 1924. He played for the Boston Braves, Philadelphia Athletics, Pittsburgh Pirates, and New York Giants.  On the 12th and 13 August 1921, Watson became the last pitcher in Major League history to start both games of a doubleheader twice in the same season.

References

External links

1896 births
1949 deaths
Major League Baseball pitchers
New York Giants (NL) players
Boston Braves players
Philadelphia Athletics players
Pittsburgh Pirates players
Baseball players from Louisiana
People from Claiborne Parish, Louisiana
Fort Smith Twins players
New Haven Murlins players
Baltimore Orioles (IL) players
New Haven Weissmen players
Minneapolis Millers (baseball) players
Elmira Colonels players
Pittsfield Hillies players
Reading Keystones players